NGC 7840 is an unbarred spiral galaxy in the constellation Pisces.
It is the last numerical entry in the New General Catalogue.

For observing from Earth's surface, it has a magnitude of 15.5 in the early 21st century. One observing guide recommended a telescope with a least 300mm aperture for observations.

See also
 Spiral galaxy
 Unbarred spiral galaxy
 List of NGC objects (7000–7840)

References

External links
 

Pisces (constellation)
Unbarred spiral galaxies
7840
1345780